The Yu-3 (鱼-3) is a Chinese acoustic homing torpedo designed to be fired from submarines against surface targets. It entered service with the Chinese Navy in 1984. Several sources state that it may be a copy of the Soviet SET-65E, although this seems unlikely as development began in 1965 after the Sino-Soviet split. It is therefore probably the first indigenously developed torpedo in China.

Development
When the Chinese nuclear submarine program begun in the early 1960s, the design of torpedoes which would be used on the nuclear submarines was also started in conjunction.  A research team was first formed in the winter of 1964 by the 705th Research Institute, and it was decided that priority should be given to acoustic homing ASW torpedo.  China was able to indigenously provide two types of propulsion systems, electrical and steam, but electrical propulsion could not provide the speed required, so the steam propulsion was selected.  However, the steam propulsion had its own problem:  there were two types of steam propulsion engines, reciprocating engine and steam turbine engine.  China only had experience with the reciprocating engine, but the mechanical motion generated loud noise which greatly reduced the effectiveness of the acoustic seeker of the torpedo.  Since the steam turbine technology was monopolized by the west, Chinese researchers suggested the plan of torpedo approaching the target at high speed, and then reduce the speed to home in on the target at low speed.  In 1964, the design was submitted to the National Defense Science and Technology Committee and named as Yu-3 torpedo, and after continued evaluation that lasted from April 1965 to October 1965, and approval was given, the permission to begin the production program was issued in March 1966.  Two month later, in May 1966, the design was change on last time, when China successfully developed silver-zinc battery, which enabled the torpedo to seek out targets at high speed, since electrically powered torpedo produced much less noise.  The final propulsion of the Yu-3 torpedo selected was thus silver-zinc battery.  The chief designer of the Yu-3 torpedo was Mr. Dong Lin (董琳), with Mr. Yang Baosheng (杨保生) and Mr. Jiang Liangfang (江连方) as the deputy chief designers.

The pressure of at operating depth of the torpedo was great, and newly developed aluminum alloy was used and successfully passed the tests.  By the end of 1966, special torpedo test range was also authorized to be built, resulting from lessons learned from the development of Yu-1 torpedo and Yu-2 torpedo.  In order to guarantee the development, the Central Military Committee of the Communist Party of China issued “Special Official Letter“ in 1967 to prevent the any disruptions from the political turmoil that plagued China at the time.  The original plan of high speed approach with low speed search and engagement had severely limited the speed of the torpedo, because the original acoustic homing seeker was very limited in its effectiveness and prone to noise radiated by the engine.  In 1967, this problem was finally solved when a new multi-beamed acoustic homing seeker was successfully developed jointly by the Acoustic Research Institute of the Chinese Academy of Science and 705th Institute, under the leadership of Mr. Hou Chaohuan (侯朝焕).  By 1969, the 750-metre-deep deepwater torpedo testing range was established with the help of over 80 enterprises and named as 750 Testing Range (750试验场) in Kunming, after the greatest simulated depth of the range, and a total of 4 sample torpedoes were produced.  In the same year, the fire control and launching system for Yu-3 torpedo were also successfully developed and installed on board the nuclear submarine.

In the autumn of 1969, Batch 0, the preproduction batch built for initial tests had been successfully tested in lakes.  Development immediately continued to directly modify Batch 0 torpedoes for oceanic trials, with modification completed in 1971, and oceanic tests begun in 1972, with the design finalized in 1975.  However, oceanic environment had caused unexpected problems and from 1974 to the beginning of 1976, over 40 enterprises were ordered by the Yunnan National Defense Office to help Dawn Machinery Factory (Shuguan Jixie Chang, 曙光机械厂) of the Yunnan 6th Machinery Bureau to complete the development of Yu-3 torpedo, but when all of the problems have been solved, it was already years after the designed had already been finalized, and due to the political turmoil in China and the technology bottlenecks, China still had a long way to go.  In December 1977, the production version of Yu-3 torpedo was successfully tested in lakes, and from March to October, 1983, work was concentrated on solving the problems discovered during oceanic tests, during which a total of 43 Yu-3 torpedoes were test fired.  Finally, in March 1984, the torpedo met all requirement and went into mass production.  In May 1988, Han class nuclear submarine had successfully test-launched Yu-3 torpedo at maximum depth in deep water testing facility in Hainan.  The torpedo was also given a name as Chinese sturgeon (Zhonghua Xun, 中华鲟).

Modification
Several modifications have been incorporated to Yu-3 torpedo.  One of the important upgrade was to incorporating ASuW capability to Yu-3 torpedo so that the submarines would no longer need to carry separate ASuW and ASW torpedoes.  In May 1985, Dawn Machinery Factory (Shuguan Jixie Chang, 曙光机械厂), 750 Test Range and 705th Research Institute jointly developed an export version as Chinese sturgeon (中华鲟)-II, with export designation as ET32, but there was no known export.  Other modifications included updating electronics and incorporating the capability of being launched from different platforms and being used as part of the CAPTOR mine type mine system

Specifications
Diameter: 533 mm
Length: 7.8 meter
Weight: 1.34 ton (1.2 ton for the training version)
Warhead: 205 kg
Guidance: active/passive acoustic homing
Propulsion: electrical, silver-zinc battery
Range: 13 km
Speed: 35 kt
Depth: up to 400 metre

ET32
ET32 torpedo with the name Chinese sturgeon (中华鲟)-II is an export version of Yu-3 torpedo marketed by China Shipbuilding Co., but as of 2009, there is no known export.  ET32 is almost identical to Yu-3, but slightly smaller, and can only be launched from submarine.
Specifications:
Diameter: 533 mm
Length: 6.6 meter
Weight: 1.34 ton
Warhead: 190 kg
Guidance: active/passive acoustic homing
Propulsion: electrical, silver-zinc battery
Range: 13 km
Speed: 35 kt
Depth: up to 350 metre
Gyro: up to 170 degrees

See also
 Export torpedoes of China

References

Torpedoes of China